Panagiotis Korbos (born 11 September 1985) is a Greek former professional footballer who played as a defensive midfielder.

Career
Born in Athens, Korbos began playing football for local side Chalkidona which was later (2005) absorbed by Atromitos. On 16 May 2004, he made his debut in Superleague as a substitute in a 2–1 away loss against PAOK.

External links
Profile at epae.org
Guardian Football
Profile at Onsports.gr

1985 births
Living people
Atromitos F.C. players
Proodeftiki F.C. players
Olympiacos Volos F.C. players
Trikala F.C. players
Levadiakos F.C. players
Panetolikos F.C. players
Chalkidona F.C. players
Panionios F.C. players
Super League Greece players
Association football midfielders
Footballers from Athens
Greek footballers